Torngat is a Canadian indie band and instrumental music trio based in Montreal, Quebec. The members are horn player Pietro Amato, keyboardist Mathieu Charbonneau and percussionist Julien Poissant.

History
Torngat was established in 2001. The band named themselves for the rugged Torngat Mountains to reflect the band's open and improvisational style of their music. The group released its first self-titled album the next year. They developed a stage show in which they frequently exchange instruments during performances.

Torngat  in 2005 released an EP, La Rouge.  During the spring of 2006, Torngat toured Eastern Canada.  Torngat signed a two-album deal with Montreal experimental label Alien8 Recordings. The band recorded a full-length album You Could Be, which was released in September, 2007 and received positive reviews. That year the band performed at the Hillside Festival in Guelph.

Band members
 Pietro Amato - french horn  (and electronics, percussion, melodeon)
 Mathieu Charbonneau - Wurlitzer (and Analog Synth, Hammond, percussion, melodeon).
 Julien Poissant - percussion (and Wurlitzer, trumpet, melodeon)

Discography
 Torngat (2002)
 Live at The Bread Factory (2004)
 La Rouge (2005)
 You Could Be (2007)
 La Petite Nicole (2009)

References
Citations

External links
 Torngat Official site
 Torngat on MySpace
 National Post 

Musical groups established in 2001
Musical groups from Montreal
Canadian post-rock groups